Asbjørn Gudbrand Vinjar (born 1925) is a Norwegian engineer and civil servant.

He graduated with the siv.ing. degree from the Norwegian Institute of Technology in 1952. He spent his career in the Norwegian Water Resources and Electricity Agency. He headed the electricity department from 1962 to 1978 and was the director of the electricity and energy from 1978 to 1990. It was renamed to the Water Resources and Energy Agency in 1986  after Statkraft was split out.

References

1925 births
Living people
Norwegian Institute of Technology alumni
Norwegian civil servants
20th-century Norwegian engineers
20th-century Norwegian civil servants